Norman A. Mordue (June 26, 1942 – December 29, 2022) was an American jurist who was a senior United States district judge of the United States District Court for the Northern District of New York.

Early life and education
Mordue grew up as one of five children in Elmira, New York and attended Manlius Military Academy. He graduated with a Bachelor of Arts degree in Economics from Syracuse University in 1966 and with a Juris Doctor from the Syracuse University College of Law in 1971.

Mordue played halfback for the Syracuse Orange football under coach Ben Schwartzwalder, playing alongside future NFL players Floyd Little and Jim Nance.  He was a member of the 1965 Sugar Bowl team.

Career
From 1972 to 1982, he worked for the district attorney in Onondaga County, New York, the last six years as chief prosecutor.

He was a county court judge from 1982 to 1988, and a State Supreme Court Justice in Onondaga County from 1986 to 1998.

Military service
Mordue earned the Purple Heart, the Bronze Star, and the Distinguished Service Cross while serving as a captain in the U.S. Army in the Vietnam War from 1966 to 1968.

Federal judicial service
Upon the recommendation of Senator Alfonse D'Amato, President Bill Clinton nominated Mordue to replace Rosemary S. Pooler on the United States District Court for the Northern District of New York in July 1998. Mordue was confirmed unanimously by the Senate on October 21, 1998, received his commission on October 22, 1998, and took office on December 4, 1998. He took senior status on June 30, 2013. He was Chief Judge of the court from 2006 to 2011.

Notable cases
As a prosecutor in the Onondaga County District Attorney's Office, Mordue successfully prosecuted Robert Garrow, a notorious serial killer convicted of murdering three campers in the Adirondacks and a teenage girl in Syracuse in 1973.

Mordue three times ruled in favor of the school district's censorship of religious content in an assignment in Peck v. Baldwinsville School District. He also ruled in favor of a school district censoring a student newspaper's cartoon of stick figures in sexual positions in R.O. v. Ithaca.

Death
Mordue died on December 29, 2022, at the age of 80.

References

Sources

1942 births
2022 deaths
20th-century American judges
21st-century American judges
Judges of the United States District Court for the Northern District of New York
Lawyers from Syracuse, New York
Manlius Pebble Hill School alumni
Maxwell School of Citizenship and Public Affairs alumni
Military personnel from Syracuse, New York
New York Supreme Court Justices
Recipients of the Distinguished Service Cross (United States)
Syracuse Orange football players
Syracuse University College of Law alumni
United States Army officers
United States district court judges appointed by Bill Clinton